The action at Barfleur was part of the battle of Barfleur-La Hougue during the War of the Grand Alliance. A French fleet under Anne Hilarion de Tourville was seeking to cover an invasion of England by a French army to restore James II to the throne, but was intercepted by an Anglo-Dutch fleet under Edward Russell, 1st Earl of Orford on 19 May Old Style (29 May New Style) 1692.

Background 
The fleets sighted each other at first light on the morning of 19 May 1692 off Cap Barfleur on the Cotentin peninsula.

On sighting the allied fleet, at about 6am, Tourville held a council of war with his captains; the advice, and his own opinion, was against action; however, Tourville felt compelled by strict orders from the king to engage. He also may have expected defections from the English fleet by captains with Jacobite sympathies, though in this he was to be disappointed.

In the light south-westerly breeze the fleets slowly closed, Russell from the north east, Tourville, with the weather gage, from the south west, on a starboard tack to bring his line of battle into contact with Russell's. Because of the calm conditions it was not until 11am, 5 hours after first sighting each other, that the two fleets were within range of each other.

Dispositions 
The French line was led by the Blue-and-White squadron, 14 ships of the line in three divisions under the flag officers Nesmond, d'Amfreville and Relingue. They were matched by the Dutch White squadron of 26 ships under Almonde, again in three divisions under van der Putte, Gilles Schey and Gerard Callenburgh.

In the centre, the French White squadron (16 ships under Villette Mursay, Tourville and Langeron) opposed the English Red squadron (27 ships under Delaval, Russell and Shovell).

Bringing up the rear, the French Blue squadron (14 ships under Coetlogon, Gabaret and Pannetier) would face the English Blue squadron (29 ships under Carter, Ashby and Rooke).

Tourville re-inforced his centre, the White squadron under his own command, by bringing Coetlogon's division forward in order to engage Russell's Red squadron with something approaching equal numbers, while he refused and extended the line of his White squadron to avoid them being turned and overwhelmed by superior numbers; the rest of his Blue squadron he held back also to keep the advantage of the weather gage.

Russell countered by holding fire as long as possible, to allow the French fleet to close; Almonde tried to extend his line to overlap the French van, while Ashby was still some way off and trying to close. The two fleets were within range at 11am, but both with-held firing for a further 15 minutes, until the Saint Louis (number 4 in the French Blue-and-White squadron) fired on her opposite number; at that the firing became general up and down the line.

Battle

Morning 
11 am to 1 pm

For the next few hours Tourville's White and Russell's Red squadrons were closely engaged, and causing each other considerable damage. Centurion 50 (Red 7) was engaged by Ambiteux 96 (White 7, Villettes flagship) and severely damaged; Chester 50 (Red 12) was outgunned by Glorieux 64 (White 8) and had to withdraw; Eagle 70 (Red 11) was forced to pull out of the line, with 70 dead, to repair damage, but was able to re-join after emergency repairs; while Grafton 70 (Red 18) suffered 80 casualties, but was able to continue.

On the French side, Soleil Royal 104 (White 10, Tourville's flagship) was engaged by three English ships, Britannia 100, (White 14, Russell's flagship) supported by London 96 (Red 15) and St Andrew 56 (White 13); she was severely damaged, and forced at one point out of the line; Perle 52 (White 7) was shot through and through, and suffered one-third of her crew as casualties. Henri 64 (White 2) and Fort 60 (White 1) were both severely damaged trying to hold the line between the White and the Blue-and-White squadrons, to prevent a gap opening; Henri was battered until she could no longer fight, and only escaped capture when Villette sent boats to tow her to safety; Forts crew were forced to use sweeps to pull her out of the line for respite.

 Afternoon 1pmAt about 1pm the wind, which up to then had been south-westerly, if it blew at all, strengthened and shifted to the east. This gave the benefit of the weather gage to the allies, who immediately took advantage of it. Shovell saw a gap in the French line ahead of him, and steered towards it; his Royal William 100 (23rd in the Red) broke through to engage the French White from both sides. He was followed by the rest of his division, while Kent 70 (Red 22), and St Albans 50 (Red 21), who were ahead of him in the line, pulled round to follow the William through the breach.

Hampton Court 70 and Swiftsure 70 (the Red 19 and 20), which were ahead of them again, remained to the windward of the French, and joined themselves to Russells division. Carter, with the leading Blue division, saw Shovell's action and followed also, giving about a dozen ships doubling the French line.

In the van, the wind enabled Almonde to extend and cross the head of the French line; Nesmond responded by turning his division into the wind also, so that over the next few hours the French Blue-and-White became at right angles to the centre (White).

Shovell's action brought Tourville's ships under fire from both sides; Soleil Royal particularly was hard pressed until Coetlogon, with Magnifique 86 (Blue 3) and Prince 56 (blue 2) interposed.3pmBy 3 o’clock the French line was curved leeward like a fish-hook; the Blue-and-White was turned back to the centre, with the Dutch extended around them. When Prince 56 (the French Blue 2, in Coetlogon's division) was hotly engaged on both sides, with a third across her stern, she was saved by Monarque 90, Nesmondes flagship.

In the centre, Coetlogon and Tourville were engaged on either side by Shovell and Russell, while Carter was matched by the French rear divisions. To the east, Ashby and Rooke were endeavouring to get into action.4pmBy 4 o’clock the wind had died, the sea becoming flat calm, and visibility dropping due to battle smoke. The continuous firing also tended to push the embattled ships apart, offering some respite, as both sides were becoming exhausted.

In the van, Nesmonde continued to turn as Almonde continued to extend and turn the line, both sides using boats to tow the ships into position, while in the rear Ashby was also using boats to bring his Blue squadron into the fray. In the poor visibility however he was unable to see Carter, his vice-admiral, who was in the position of advantage with Shovell beyond the French line, and sorely pressed: He continued to head towards the French Blue squadron, which was north of the main action.5pmBy 5pm the centres were re-engaged; Russell had used his boats to tow his ships back into action. The fog had lifted, cleared by a light breeze. As the wind strengthened, Tourville headed north west towards Carter, in order to fight his way out of the encirclement. Russell pursued, until the wind, unpredictable all day, died away and the mist closed in once more.

 Evening 6pmAt around 6pm the tide began to turn; seeking to take advantage of this, and remembering how the English had escaped after the battle of Beachy Head two years before, Tourville had his ships anchor at the end of slack water, with their sails still set. Deceived by this, Russell's squadron was carried away by the flood tide, until they could themselves anchor, now out of range giving the French a respite. Shovell's ships, uptide of the French, had also anchored, either foreseeing the French manoeuvre, or seeking respite themselves; only Sandwich 90 (Red 24) was unprepared, and was swept by the flood into and through the French line, being severely damaged, and suffering many casualties, including her captain.7pmAt around 7pm the wind arose again, from the southeast, allowing the English Blue squadron to join the action. Because of Ashby's previous manoeuvres, Rooke's division was now closer to the embattled Red squadron, and joined the fray.

Neptune 96 (Blue 24, Rooke's flagship), Windsor Castle 90 (Blue 25) and Expedition 70 (Blue 26), were able to engage the French ships, particularly Soleil Royal and Ambiteux, increasing the damage they had already sustained. Ashby, in Victory 100 (Blue 14) and the rest of his division joined the fray shortly after, engaging the main body for the next two hours.8pmShovell's ships were still in range of the French, but found themselves sternwards to the French bows, so only a few guns on either side could be engaged. From his position uptide, Shovell attempted to break up the French formation by sending fireships onto them with the tide; his intent was to oblige Tourville to cut his anchor cables to escape them, leaving him to drift with the tide onto Russell's guns. Four fireships were released, but the French were able to fend them off . One fireship became entangled with Perle, but her crew were able to cut it loose; another, released by Cambridge, 70, and aimed at Soleil Royal, came so close as to persuade the French flagship to cut, but she was able to re-anchor before coming within range of Russell's ships.9pmAt around 9pm Shovell and Rooke decided their position was too exposed to be tenable. As the only ships between the French fleet and the open sea, and being out of contact with the rest of the allied fleet, they decided to use the last of the flood tide to sail through the French fleet and re-join the English line. French contemporary accounts present this as a mistake, as their position placed Tourville in some difficulty, but it is conceivable that if the whole French fleet swept down on them on the ebb, they would be overwhelmed. As it was, the manoeuvre was fraught with difficulty; all their ships were exposed to close raking fire, and were cut up severely.

 Aftermath 10pm'''

By 10pm the battle was almost over. Both sides were exhausted, and the majority of the ships on both sides were damaged, many severely. Amazingly, none of the ships from either line were lost; none were sunk or captured. Shovell had expended four of his fireships without result, and another had burned earlier after being hit by gunfire; these could be seen burning in the night, and were noted by the captain of the Monmouth in his log. Both sides reported a large explosion around this time, but both thought it was a ship from the opposing fleet. Whichever ship it involved, it was not fatal, as all the ships from both lines were accounted for after the action. On the turn of the tide, and in the moonlight, Tourville ordered the French fleet to cut their anchor cables and slip away; the allies followed on as they could.

 Ships 

 Allies 

 French 

Notes

 References 
 
 
 
 
 
 

Further reading
 Jenkins, E.H.: A History of the French Navy (1973)
 Mahan, A.T.: The Influence of Sea-Power upon History 1660–1805 (1890, abridged 1980). .
 Rodger, N.A.M.: The Command of The Ocean''. (2004) .

1692 in France
Barfleur
History of Manche
Military history of Normandy
Barfleur